White Pine or White Pines may refer to:

Trees

Trees in the pine subgenus Pinus subgenus Strobus 
 Eastern white pine (Pinus strobus), one of these species, native to northeastern North America
 Western white pine (Pinus monticola), another of these species, native to northwestern North America
 Limber pine (Pinus flexilis), another of these species from western North America, was also sometimes known as White Pine
 Chinese white pine (Pinus armandii), a species native to China
 Japanese white pine (Pinus parviflora), a species native to Japan
 Vietnamese white pine (Pinus dalatensis), a species native to Vietnam and Laos
 Pinus albicaulis, of subsection Cembra (the stone pines), native to western North America

Other coniferous trees called White Pine 

 Kahikatea (Dacrycarpus dacrydioides), a podocarp tree endemic to New Zealand

Places

United States 
 White Pines, California
 White Pine, Michigan
 White Pine, Tennessee
 White Pine County, Nevada
 White Pine Haven, Wisconsin
 White Pine Township, Aitkin County, Minnesota
 White Pine, West Virginia
 White Pine Creek, a stream in Idaho

Other uses
 White Pine Music, a record label